Gamal al-Banna (also: Jamal al-Banna, ; ‎ 15 December 1920 – 30 January 2013) was an Egyptian author, and trade unionist. He was the youngest brother of Hassan al-Banna (1906–49), founder of the Muslim Brotherhood. Al-Banna was considered a liberal scholar, known for his criticism of Islamic traditional narratives rejecting 635 Hadiths of Sahih Bukhari and Sahih Muslim which he finds contradictory to the Qur'an. He was a great-uncle of the Swiss Muslim academic and writer Tariq Ramadan.

Early life
Born in 1920 into a pious family in Mahmudiya, Gamal was the youngest brother of Hassan al-Banna, the founder of the Muslim Brotherhood. His father mended watches for a living but spent much time collecting and classifying hadiths. As a child he was weak and sickly, so he spent his time reading with his father. After completing secondary school he refused to go to university but decided instead to start a writing career.

Thinking
Gamal al-Banna represented an interpretation of Islam which is rationalist, humanist, egalitarian, feminist, anti-authoritarian, liberal and secular. As a political thinker and social reformer he adopted an anti-capitalist position. In Al-barnamadj al-islami (The Islamic Program), he wrote the following in the preface, when the end of the Cold War became apparent in 1991 ("A Disrupted World", pp. 6–8):<blockquote>The collapse of Marxism doesn't mean that capitalism will succeed. Rather, this means that the mistakes of Marxism were bigger than the mistakes of capitalism. [...] Most people forget that Islam occurred at a time when the world was divided into two huge states forcing upon it humiliating subjection, class rule, and the government of tyrants. Both deprived the masses of the most fundamental principles of justice and left them in poverty and ignorance, burdened with the back-breaking load of forced labor which leaves them neither time nor health, nor opportunities to think. Both enthroned Caesars and Chosroes as gods exerting authority over life and death. Then Islam came and destroyed these systems: it replaced the class system with its elitist barriers and dead ends by the general equality of the people, the highest ranks or the strata of notables by the declaration of absolute equality among the people, without any difference between black and white, male and female, rich and poor, base and noble. [...] It was not the prayer or the fast that constituted the new gift, for the cultic commandments are represented in all religions. Rather, what was new was the spirit of freedom, the principles of justice and equality that Islam let shine. Today Islam is called upon to fulfill this role a second time."Al-Banna, Gamal, The Appeal to an Islamic Revival, dar al-fikr al-islami. Cairo, 2005.</blockquote>

Humanism and social justice
Al-Banna was committed to the labor and trade-unionist movement for decades. He was a labor union official in the textile industry. In 1953, he founded The Egyptian Society for the Care of Prisoners and their Families. Al-Banna taught at the Cairo Institute of Trade-Union Studies for 30 years (1963–93). In 1981, he founded the International Islamic Confederation of Labor in Geneva, Switzerland and became its first president.

According to al-Banna, Islam is anti-capitalist. He was opposed to severe punishment, e.g. the death penalty for apostasy as well as in his opposition to the discrimination against women or religious minorities such as the Coptic Christians in Egypt.

Egalitarianism and feminism
Gamal al-Banna was a strict egalitarian: Islam gives women and men the same rights and duties, and a good Muslim regards all human beings as equal, no matter what their religion is. As for the role of women in Islam, al-Banna claimed to see no reason why a Muslim woman could not take over the role of imam (female: imama, i.e. leader) in the prayer salat.

Liberalism
For al-Banna, religious thinking may not be restricted in any way. Al-Banna's freedom of belief comprises a Muslim's conversion which does not permit anyone to harm him or her. Al-Banna wrote al-mar`a al-muslima baina tahrir al-qur'an wa taqjid al-fuqaha (The Muslim Woman Between Being Liberated by the Quran and Being Enchained by the Sharia Jurists). dar al-fikr al-islami. Cairo, 2002.

Secularism
Al-Banna was a religious Muslim who supported the notion of an "Islamic state", for it is often by politicians for political ends whereby both the Muslims and Islam are harmed. He championed the protection of state and religion, to protect Muslims and Islam from the political establishment's misuse of politics.

Media
Al-Banna frequently appeared on Egyptian and other Arab TV programs where he answers questions and took part in discussions (see "Videos" below), which sometimes proved awkward for the television networks. During Ramadan 2006, e.g., he said smoking was not forbidden and that Muslims were free to smoke in the daytime during Ramadan. He justified that by the fact that there were no cigarettes in the prophetic era (7th century AD) and that neither the Quran nor Messenger Muhammad prohibited smoking explicitly."Ramadan fast means hard times for Muslim smokers", Karin Laub and Dalia Nammari (Associated Press), usatoday.com, 22 September 2008.

Other books by Gamal al-Banna not referenced above

The author of "over fifty books", some of his publications include: 
 Al-Banna, Gamal: tathwir al-qur`an (The Revolutionization of the Quran). dar al-fikr al-islami. Cairo, 2000.
 Al-Banna, Gamal: tafnid da´wa hadd ar-ridda (Refutation of the Demand of the Punishment for Apostasy). dar ash-shuruq. Cairo, 2008.
 Al-Banna, Gamal: al-hejab (The Headscarf). dar al-fikr al-islami. Cairo, 2002.

 See also 
 Islamic Modernism

References

Further reading
 Gemeinhardt-Buschhardt, Konstanze: Gamal al-Banna und sein Schaffen – Ein reformislamischer Ansatz zur Verbesserung der Situation der muslimischen Frau. In: Hermeneutik und Exegese – Verstehenslehre und Verstehensdeutung im Regionalen System koexistierender Religionsgemeinschaften im Orient. Hrsg. Ute Pietruschka, Hallesche Beiträge zur Orientwissenschaft 43 (2007), Halle 2009, S.49-62  Translation to English: Gemeinhardt-Busch Hardt, Konstanze (author): Gamal al-Banna and his work – a reform of Islamic approach to improving the situation of Muslim women. In: hermeneutics and exegesis – Understanding teaching and interpretation in understanding regional system of co-existing religious communities in the Orient. Ed. Ute Pietruschka, Halle contributions to Oriental Studies 43 (2007), Halle 2009, S.49-62.

External links
Official website
Website of Gamal al-Banna (in English, French, and Arabic)
Profile, The Guardian'', 15 March 2007; accessed 4 November 2014. 
Profile, bbc.co.uk, 30 September 2006; accessed 4 November 2014.

1920 births
2013 deaths
20th-century Muslim scholars of Islam
Egyptian Quranist Muslims
Egyptian Muslim scholars of Islam
Deaths from pneumonia in Egypt